KKPN (102.3 FM), known as "Planet 102.3", is a Top 40 radio station serving the Corpus Christi Metropolitan Area in the state of Texas.  The station's musical format includes a balance of hip hop, rock music, and pop music in rotation.  Its studios are located along South Padre Island Drive in Corpus Christi, and the transmitter is in Ingleside, Texas.

Planet 102.3 also airs The Kidd Kraddick Morning Show  from Clear Channel's 106.1 KHKS in Dallas, Texas.

External links
 KKPN-FM official website
 

KPN
Contemporary hit radio stations in the United States
Radio stations established in 1988
1988 establishments in Texas